The 1973 Montreal Expos season was the fifth season in the history of the franchise. The Expos finished in fourth place in the National League East with a record of 79–83, 3½ games behind the New York Mets.

Offseason
 January 10, 1973: Dan Boitano was drafted by the Expos in the 2nd round of the 1973 Major League Baseball draft (Secondary Phase), but did not sign.
 February 28, 1973: Carl Morton was traded by the Expos to the Atlanta Braves for Pat Jarvis.

Spring training
After holding spring training at West Palm Beach Municipal Stadium in West Palm Beach, Florida, from 1969 to 1972, the Expos moved to City Island Ball Park in Daytona Beach for spring training in 1973. They trained at City Island Ball Park through 1980 before returning to West Palm Beach Municipal Stadium for the 1981 season.

Regular season

Season standings

Record vs. opponents

Opening Day lineup

Notable transactions
 June 5, 1973: 1973 Major League Baseball draft
Jeff Reardon was drafted by the Expos in the 23rd round, but did not sign.
Tim Ireland was drafted by the Expos in the 25th round.
Warren Cromartie was drafted by the Expos in the 1st round (5th pick) of the Secondary Phase.
 August 13, 1973: Bernie Allen was purchased by the Expos from the New York Yankees.
 September 5, 1973: Coco Laboy was released by the Expos.

Roster

Player stats

Batting

Starters by position
Note: Pos = Position; G = Games played; AB = At bats; H = Hits; Avg. = Batting average; HR = Home runs; RBI = Runs batted in

Other batters
Note: G = Games played; AB = At bats; H = Hits; Avg. = Batting average; HR = Home runs; RBI = Runs batted in

Pitching

Starting pitchers
Note: G = Games pitched; IP = Innings pitched; W = Wins; L = Losses; ERA = Earned run average; SO = Strikeouts

Other pitchers
Note: G = Games pitched; IP = Innings pitched; W = Wins; L = Losses; ERA = Earned run average; SO = Strikeouts

Relief pitchers
Note: G = Games pitched; W = Wins; L = Losses; SV = Saves; ERA = Earned run average; SO = Strikeouts

Award winners
 Mike Jorgensen, Gold Glove, first base
 Gene Mauch, Associated Press NL Manager of the Year

All-Stars 
1973 Major League Baseball All-Star Game

Farm system

Notes

References

 1973 Montreal Expos at Baseball Reference
 1973 Montreal Expos at Baseball Almanac
 

Montreal Expos seasons
Montreal Expos season
1970s in Montreal
1973 in Quebec